The 1931–32 Scottish Districts season is a record of all the rugby union matches for Scotland's district teams.

History

Edinburgh District beat Glasgow District in the Inter-City match.

The principal dates for season 1931-32 will be:—- October 28, Glasgow District v. South Africans; October 31, South of Scotland v. South Africans at Melrose; November 7, North v. Midlands at Dundee; November 21, North v. South at Selkirk; December 19, Scotland (Probables) v. Rest (Possibles) at Murrayfield; January 9, North of Scotland v. South Africans at Aberdeen; January 16. Scotland v. South Africa at Murrayfield; February 7, Scotland v. Wales at Murrayfield; February 21. Scotland v. Ireland at Murrayfield: March i 9, Scotland v. England Twickenham.

North v Midlands.
Glasgow v South Africa 28 October 1931.

South v South Africa 31 October 1931.

Results

Inter-City

Glasgow District:

Edinburgh District:

Other Scottish matches

Midlands District:

North of Scotland District: 

South of Scotland District:

North of Scotland District:

Junior matches

Edinburgh District:

Glasgow District:

Edinburgh District:

South of Scotland District:

Trial matches

Probables:

Possibles:

English matches

No other District matches played.

International matches

Glasgow District:

South Africa: 

South of Scotland District:

South Africa: 

North of Scotland District:

South Africa:

References

1931–32 in Scottish rugby union
Scottish Districts seasons